Karafestan may refer to:
 Karafestan, Amlash
 Karafestan, Siahkal